William Cradock   (b Wolverhampton 28 June 1741 - d Edinburgh 1 May 1793) was an Irish Anglican priest in the 18th-century.

Cradock was educated at Shrewsbury School and St John's College, Cambridge. He was Archdeacon of Kilmore from 1770 until 1775; and Dean of St Patrick's Cathedral, Dublin from then until his death.

References

1741 births
People educated at Shrewsbury School
Alumni of St John's College, Cambridge
Irish Anglicans
Archdeacons of Kilmore
Deans of St. Patrick's Cathedral, Dublin
1793 deaths
People from Wolverhampton